Three is the third studio album by British girl group Sugababes, released by Island Records on 27 October 2003. It generated four singles that charted in various parts of the world; the first, "Hole in the Head", became the group's third UK number one single. The three members of the Sugababes each recorded a "solo" song on the album—"Whatever Makes You Happy" (Keisha Buchanan), "Sometimes" (Heidi Range) and "Maya" (Mutya Buena). Three debuted at number three on the UK Albums Chart.

Background
After releasing "Shape", the fourth and final single from their successful previous album Angels with Dirty Faces (2002), the group announced that they had gone back into the studio to start work on the next album with producers whom they worked with on the previous album such as Jony Rockstar and Xenomania. They went over to America to work with producers such as Linda Perry and Diane Warren, who wrote the ballad "Too Lost in You". They had also aimed to promote the new album in America. The girls co-wrote and recorded their own tracks on the new album—Keisha's being "Whatever Makes You Happy", Heidi's being "Sometimes", and Mutya's being "Maya", a song about her sister who died unexpectedly. The Sugababes later announced the lead single "Hole in the Head" and its release date of 13 October. The UK release was a special edition with two extra tracks, "Twisted" and "Buster". Initially, the digital download version offered by Woolworths in the UK accidentally contained an earlier demo version of "Whatever Makes You Happy" but the mistake was quickly rectified. On streaming services, an alternative version of "Whatever Makes You Happy" has replaced the original album version.

Commercial performance
Three debuted at number three on the UK Albums Chart with 52,905 copies sold in its first week. The first single, "Hole in the Head", was the group's third number-one single in the United Kingdom and also went to number one in Denmark. It reached number two in Ireland and Norway, and the top forty in Australia. The second single, "Too Lost in You", reached the top ten in the UK and Norway, and the top forty in Australia. The third single, "In the Middle", went top ten in the UK, top twenty in Ireland and top forty in Europe and Australia. A fourth single, "Caught in a Moment", also reached the top ten in the UK.

In 2004, "Hole in the Head" was serviced to radio in the United States and became a top forty hit on pop radio. Following the moderate success of the single, Three was due for release in the US on 22 June 2004 with an altered track listing featuring singles from the group's previous album, Angels with Dirty Faces (2002). The release was subsequently cancelled. In the UK, the album is certified two times Platinum by the BPI. The album also received a Platinum Europe Award by the IFPI in recognition of European sales in excess of 1 million copies.

Critical reception
Three received positive reviews from critics, who praised the experimental new urban and hip hop sounds on the album. Alan Braidwood from the BBC gave Three a positive review, stating the album takes lead from Angels with Dirty Faces and calling it a fresh and exciting album. He also praised the new sound on the album. Ross Hoffman from AllMusic described the album as "tuneful, R&B-inflected dance-pop with fresh-sounding but accessible productions, along with a healthy smattering of big droopy ballads with an expanded stylistic range".

Track listing

Notes and sample credits
 denotes additional producer
 denotes original producer
"Whatever Makes You Happy" samples the music from the Sly Fox song "Let's Go All the Way".
"In the Middle" contains a sample from "U Know Y" performed by German DJ Moguai.

Charts and certifications

Weekly charts

Year-end charts

Certifications and sales

Release history

References

2003 albums
Albums produced by Linda Perry
Albums produced by Xenomania
Island Records albums
Sugababes albums